The following is about the qualification rules and the quota allocation for the speed skating at the 2022 Winter Olympics.

Qualification rules
A total quota of 166 athletes were allowed to compete at the Games. Countries were assigned quotas based on their performance during the 2021–22 ISU Speed Skating World Cup in the autumn of 2021. Each nation was permitted to enter a maximum of three athletes per gender for all events apart from the women's 5000m, men's 10000m and mass start events, for which they could enter a maximum of two athletes per event. Additionally, each nation is permitted to send at most 7 speed skating athletes per gender in total, or 8 when the nation is qualified for all events for the gender, or 9 when the nation is qualified with the maximum quota in every event for the gender.

Qualification times
The following qualification times were released on July 1, 2021, and were unchanged from 2018. Skaters had the time period of July 1, 2021 – January 16, 2022 to achieve qualification times at valid International Skating Union (ISU) events.

Maximum entries by country per event

Maximum quotas per event
Men

Women

Qualification timeline

Qualification summary
On 22 December 2021, the ISU published their list of provisional allocations for each race and the total maximum allocation for each NOC.  NOCs will inform the ISU how many quotas they will use by 16 January 2022, at which point either withdrawal or reallocation will be done to get to 166 total athletes. The final entries were revealed on January 24, 2022.

Points Ranking

Men's 500m
The top 20 athletes, with a maximum of 3 per NOC, will earn a quota for their country.

After all 8 races

Men's 1000m
The top 20 athletes, with a maximum of 3 per NOC, will earn a quota for their country.

After all 4 races

Men's 1500m
The top 20 athletes, with a maximum of 3 per NOC, will earn a quota for their country.

After all 4 races

Men's 5000m and 10000m
The qualification points ranking for the men's 5000m and 10000m are combined.
The top 14 athletes, with a maximum of 3 per NOC, will earn a quota for their country in the 5000m. The top 8 athletes, with a maximum of 2 per NOC, will earn a quota for their country in the 10000m.

After all 4 races

Men's Mass Start
The top 24 athletes, with a maximum of 2 per NOC, will earn a quota for their country in the mass start. The next 8 athletes will be on the reserve list.
Up to six additional starting positions for the mass start will be made available during the games, given in reserve order, with priority given to countries that do not yet have an entry. However, only skaters that already took part in another event will be eligible.

After all 3 races

Men's Team pursuit
The top six nations will earn a quota for the Team pursuit.

After all 3 races

Women's 500m
The top 20 athletes, with a maximum of 3 per NOC, will earn a quota for their country.

After all 8 races

Women's 1000m
The top 20 athletes, with a maximum of 3 per NOC, will earn a quota for their country.

After all 4 races

Women's 1500m
The top 20 athletes, with a maximum of 3 per NOC, will earn a quota for their country.

After all 4 races

Women's 3000m and 5000m
The qualification points ranking for the women's 3000m and 5000m are combined.
The top 14 athletes, with a maximum of 3 per NOC, will earn a quota for their country in the 3000m. The top 8 athletes, with a maximum of 2 per NOC, will earn a quota for their country in the 5000m.

After all 4 races

Women's Mass Start
The top 24 athletes, with a maximum of 2 per NOC, will earn a quota for their country in the mass start. The next 8 athletes will be on the reserve list.
Up to six additional starting positions for the mass start will be made available during the games, given in reserve order, with priority given to countries that do not yet have an entry. However, only skaters that already took part if another event will be eligible.

After all 3 races

Women's Team pursuit
The top six nations will earn a quota for the Team pursuit.

After all 3 races

Time Ranking

Men's 500m
The top 10 athletes not qualified through the point ranking, with a maximum of 2 per NOC, will earn a quota for their country.
The top 8 unqualified athletes, including athletes who could not qualify through the time ranking because their NOC already has 2 quotas, will form the reserve list.  Three quotas from the reserve list were available, green shading indicates acceptance.

After all 8 races

Men's 1000m
The top 10 athletes not qualified through the point ranking, with a maximum of 2 per NOC, will earn a quota for their country.
The top 8 unqualified athletes, including athletes who could not qualify through the time ranking because their NOC already has 2 quotas, will form the reserve list. Three quotas from the reserve list were available, green shading indicates acceptance.

After all 4 races

Men's 1500m
The top 10 athletes not qualified through the point ranking, with a maximum of 2 per NOC, will earn a quota for their country.
The top 8 unqualified athletes, including athletes who could not qualify through the time ranking because their NOC already has 2 quotas, will form the reserve list. Seven quotas from the reserve list were available, green shading indicates acceptance, quotas achieved from points by Germany and Japan were refused.

After all 4 races

Men's 5000m
The top 6 athletes not qualified through the point ranking, with a maximum of 2 per NOC, will earn a quota for their country.
The top 8 unqualified athletes, including athletes who could not qualify through the time ranking because their NOC already has 2 quotas, will form the reserve list. One quota from the reserve list was available, green shading indicates acceptance

After all 3 races

Men's 10000m
The top 4 athletes not qualified through the point ranking, with a maximum of 2 per NOC, will earn a quota for their country.
The top 8 unqualified athletes will form the reserve list.

After the only race has been held

Men's Team pursuit
The top 2 nations not qualified through the point ranking will earn a quota.
The top 3 unqualified nations will form the reserve list.

After all 3 races

Women's 500m
The top 10 athletes not qualified through the point ranking, with a maximum of 2 per NOC, will earn a quota for their country.
The top 8 unqualified athletes, including athletes who could not qualify through the time ranking because their NOC already has 2 quotas, will form the reserve list. Four quotas from the reserve list were available, green shading indicates acceptance

After all 8 races

Women's 1000m
The top 10 athletes not qualified through the point ranking, with a maximum of 2 per NOC, will earn a quota for their country.
The top 8 unqualified athletes, including athletes who could not qualify through the time ranking because their NOC already has 2 quotas, will form the reserve list. Three quotas from the reserve list were available, green shading indicates acceptance

After all 4 races

Women's 1500m
The top 10 athletes not qualified through the point ranking, with a maximum of 2 per NOC, will earn a quota for their country.
The top 8 unqualified athletes, including athletes who could not qualify through the time ranking because their NOC already has 2 quotas, will form the reserve list. Three quotas from the reserve list were available, green shading indicates acceptance

After all 4 races

Women's 3000m
The top 6 athletes not qualified through the point ranking, with a maximum of 2 per NOC, will earn a quota for their country.
The top 8 unqualified athletes, including athletes who could not qualify through the time ranking because their NOC already has 2 quotas, will form the reserve list. Two quotas from the reserve list were available, green shading indicates acceptance

After all 3 races

Women's 5000m
The top 4 athletes not qualified through the point ranking, with a maximum of 2 per NOC, will earn a quota for their country.
The top 8 unqualified athletes will form the reserve list.

After the only race has been held

Women's Team pursuit
The top 2 nations not qualified through the point ranking will earn a quota.
The top 3 unqualified nations will form the reserve list.

After all 3 races

References

Qualification
Qualification for the 2022 Winter Olympics